Caputia is a small genus of flowering plants in the family Asteraceae, native to South Africa. It may be of hybrid origin. Species in this genus were formerly considered part of the genus Senecio.

Species
Currently accepted species include:
Caputia medley-woodii (Hutch.) B.Nord. & Pelser
Caputia oribiensis (van Jaarsv.) J.C.Manning
Caputia pyramidata (DC.) B.Nord. & Pelser
Caputia scaposa (DC.) B.Nord. & Pelser
Caputia tomentosa (Haw.) B.Nord. & Pelser

References

Senecioneae
Asteraceae genera